Chain Jayapal is a 1985 Indian Tamil-language film directed by Rama Narayanan for K.G.Balakrishnan. The film stars Rajesh, Radha Ravi, Rajeev and Rajkumar Sethupathi .

Cast

Soundtrack

References

External links

1985 films
1980s Tamil-language films
Films scored by Shankar–Ganesh
Films directed by Rama Narayanan
Indian action films
1985 action films